Apodanthes is a genus of flowering plants in the family Apodanthaceae. It has only one currently accepted species, Apodanthes caseariae, native to Central America and northern South America. It is a holoparasite that lives inside plants from the families Salicaceae and Fabaceae, and emerges only to flower.

References

Monotypic Cucurbitales genera
Apodanthaceae
Parasitic plants
Flora of Central America
Flora of northern South America
Flora of western South America
Flora of Brazil
Plants described in 1896